Shoreham College is a private day school for boys and girls aged 3 to 16, which is located in Shoreham-by-Sea on the Sussex coast between Brighton and Worthing.

The school is a charitable trust whose trustees form the College Council. The current principal is Mrs Sarah Bakhtiari..

History
Shoreham College was founded in 1852 as "New Protestant Shoreham Grammar School" by some "leading gentlemen of that town" and later renamed "Shoreham Grammar School". It was founded with the intention of educating local boys in classics, and "other branches of a liberal education" with a central focus on the Bible. The foundation was backed by townspeople and local clergymen against puseyism and the revival of Catholic traditions in the Church of England, in particular "High church". On 27 November 1852 an advertisement for pupils was published in the Brighton Herald.

One of the buildings the school occupies was formerly a house which dates back to the 18th century and is a Grade II listed building.

Houses
Upon joining the school, pupils are placed in either Grenville, Nelson, Rodney or Raleigh house, to which they remain attached through their school career.

Throughout the year, many inter-house competitions take place, encompassing subject areas such as music, art and sport. During the school's Speech Day (a prize-giving event held at the end of each academic year), three prize shields are available for the house which has achieved: the most house points for pupils' good conduct; the best exam results; and the most points overall (gained from inter-house events over year).

Notable former pupils

 Marcus Butler - vlogger
 Peter Cushing OBE, actor
 Chris Eubank Jr., professional boxer 
 Michael McCabe, producer
 Geoffrey Munn OBE, MVO, author, managing director of London jewellers, Wartski, BBC Antiques Roadshow jewellery expert
 Steve Nardelli, musician and songwriter
 David Ryall, actor
 Matthew Waterhouse, actor

References

External links
 School website
 Profile on the Independent Schools Council website

Educational institutions established in 1852
Private schools in West Sussex
Member schools of the Independent Schools Association (UK)
1852 establishments in England
Grade II listed buildings in West Sussex

Shoreham-by-Sea